Thomas Craven Moses (born 3 May 1992) is a British former professional cyclist, who competed professionally between 2013 and 2019. After retiring from cycling, Moses retrained as a tree surgeon. and cycling coach for British based coaching company, Rowe & King .

Major results

2010
 6th Paris–Roubaix Juniors
2011
 1st Roy Thame Cup
 2nd  Madison (with Jon Mould), National Track Championships
2013
 3rd Road race, National Under-23 Road Championships
 9th Paris–Camembert
2014
 1st Rutland–Melton International CiCLE Classic
 1st Stage 1 Tour de Normandie
 5th Overall Tour of the Reservoir
2015
 2nd Ryedale Grand Prix
2016
 4th Overall Tour of the Reservoir
1st Stage 1
2017
 5th Overall Tour of the Reservoir
1st Stage 2
2018
 1st  Overall Tour of the Reservoir
1st Stage 2

References

External links

1992 births
Living people
British male cyclists
Arborists